Steer Creek is a tributary of the Little Kanawha River in central West Virginia in the United States.

Steer Creek is formed by the confluence of its Right Fork and its Left Fork:

According to the West Virginia Department of Environmental Protection, approximately 91.1% of the Steer Creek watershed is forested, mostly deciduous.  Approximately 8.7% is used for pasture and agriculture.

See also
List of rivers of West Virginia

References 

Rivers of West Virginia
Little Kanawha River
Rivers of Braxton County, West Virginia
Rivers of Calhoun County, West Virginia
Rivers of Gilmer County, West Virginia